The 2000 Tri Nations Series was the fifth Tri Nations Series, an annual rugby union competition contested by the national rugby union teams of Australia, New Zealand and South Africa. It was played from 15 July to 26 August 2000. Australia won the tournament for the first time after a 19–18 win over South Africa in Durban.

The opening game of the tournament between Australia and New Zealand attracted a world record rugby union crowd of 109,874 to Stadium Australia.

Australia made it three wins in a row in the Bledisloe Cup, having taken it from New Zealand in 1998.

Table

Results

External links
Tri Nations at Rugby.com.au

Tri Nations
The Rugby Championship
Tri
Tri
Tri Nations